This is a collection of lists of organisms by their population. While most of the numbers are estimates, they have been made by the experts in their fields. Species population is a science falling under the purview of population ecology and biogeography. Individuals are counted by census, as carried out for the piping plover; using the transect method, as done for the mountain plover; and beginning in 2012 by satellite, with the emperor penguin being first subject counted in this manner.

Number of species
More than 99 percent of all species, amounting to over five billion species, that ever lived on Earth are estimated to be extinct. Estimates on the number of Earth's current species range from 10 million to 14 million, of which about 1.2 million have been documented and over 86 percent have not yet been described. According to another study, the number of described species has been estimated at 1,899,587. 2000–2009 saw approximately 17,000 species described per year. The total number of undescribed organisms is unknown, but marine microbial species alone could number 20,000,000. For this reason, the number of quantified species will always lag behind the number of described species, and species contained in these lists tend to be on the K side of the r/K selection continuum. More recently, in May 2016, scientists reported that 1 trillion species are estimated to be on Earth currently with only one-thousandth of one percent described. The total number of related DNA base pairs on Earth is estimated at 5.0 x 1037 and weighs 50 billion tonnes. In comparison, the total mass of the biosphere has been estimated to be as much as 4 TtC (trillion [million million] tonnes of carbon). In July 2016, scientists reported identifying a set of 355 genes from the Last universal common ancestor (LUCA) of all organisms living on Earth.

By domain
The domain of eukaryotes represent a small minority of the number of organisms; however, due to their generally much larger size, their collective global biomass is estimated to be about equal to that of prokaryotes. Prokaryotes number about 4–6 × 1030 cells and 350–550 Pg of C.

Microbes
It is estimated that the most numerous bacteria are of a species of the Pelagibacterales (or SAR11) clade, perhaps Pelagibacter ubique, and the most numerous viruses are bacteriophages infecting these species. It is estimated that the oceans contain about 2.4 × 1028 (24 octillion) SAR11 cells.
The Deep Carbon Observatory has been exploring living forms in the interior of the Earth. "Life in deep Earth totals 15 to 23 billion tons of carbon".

Animalia

Vertebrates

Mammals (Mammalia)

 Mammals by population
Artiodactyla 
 Carnivora 
 Cetacea 
 Chiroptera 
 Perissodactyla 
 Primates 
 Elephants 
Marsupials

Birds (Aves)
 Birds by population
 Anseriformes 
 Apodiformes 
 Caprimulgiformes 
 Charadriiformes 
 Ciconiiformes 
 Columbiformes 
 Coraciiformes 
 Cuculiformes 
 Falconiformes 
 Galliformes 
 The domesticated chicken (Gallus gallus domesticus), a Galliform, has an estimated population of 23.7 billion, which is higher than any other bird.
 Gaviiformes 
 Gruiformes 
 Passeriformes 
 Pelecaniformes 
 Phoenicopteriformes 
 Piciformes 
 Podicipediformes 
 Procellariiformes 
 Psittaciformes 
 Sphenisciformes 
 Strigiformes 
 Struthioniformes 
 Tinamiformes 
 Trogoniformes

Reptiles (Reptilia)

Fish (Osteichthyes, Chondrichthyes, and Agnatha)
There are an estimated 3.5 trillion fish in the ocean.

Hexapoda

Insects (Insecta)
Recent figures indicate that there are more than 1.4 billion insects for each human on the planet, or roughly 1019 (10 quintillion) individual living insects on the earth at any given time. An article in The New York Times claimed that the world holds 300 pounds of insects for every pound of humans. Ants have colonised almost every landmass on Earth. Their population is estimated as between 1016–1017 (10-100 quadrillion). With an estimated 20 quadrillion ants their biomass comes to 12 megatons of dry carbon, which is more than all wild birds and mammals combined.

Plantae

Trees 

According to NASA in 2005, there were over 400 billion trees on our globe. However, more recently, in 2015, using better methods, the global tree count has been estimated at 3 trillion. Other studies show that the Amazonian forest alone yields approximately 430 billion trees. Extrapolations from data compiled over a period of 10 years suggest that greater Amazonia, which includes the Amazon Basin and the Guiana Shield, harbors around 390 billion individual trees.

See also

 Biomass (ecology)
 Largest organisms
 List of longest-living organisms
 List of organisms by chromosome count
 Lists of animals
 Lists of extinct animals
 Lists of mammals by population
 World population (humans)
 List of birds by population
 Primary production
 Smallest organisms
 The world's 100 most threatened species
 Latitudinal gradients in species diversity

References

Biology-related lists
Lists of biota